Jagged Edge is the eponymous fifth studio album by American R&B group Jagged Edge. It was released by Sony Urban Music and Columbia Records on May 9, 2006. It debuted at number four on the US Billboard 200 with first-week sales of 115,000 copies, and m spawned four singles, "So Amazing", "Good Luck Charm", "Season's Change" and "Stunnas".

Track listing

 Notes and samples
  signifies co-producer
 "So High" contains interpolations of "Affirmative Action" by Nas.

Charts

Weekly charts

Year-end charts

References

2006 albums
Jagged Edge (American group) albums
Albums produced by Jermaine Dupri